Dayılar (literally "maternal uncles" in Turkish) may refer to:

 Dayılar, Aladağ, a village in the district of Aladağ, Adana Province, Turkey
 Dayılar, Beşiri, a village in the district of Beşiri, Batman Province, Turkey
 Dayılar, Çal
 Dayılar, Hizan, a village